Oleksii Yanin (? – 7 April 2022, Mariupol) was a Ukrainian athlete and soldier. As a kickboxer, he ranked as the National champion in Ukraine. He also became the world champion in Thai boxing (Muay Thai).

Biography
At the age of 9 he started boxing. At the age of 21, he went into Thai boxing.

Yanin joined the Armed Forces of Ukraine as a volunteer in 2014. He served in a separate special forces unit of the National Guard "Azov". He died on 7 of April 2022 during the defense of Mariupol.

Personal life
Oleksii is survived by his wife and son.

References 

20th-century births
2022 deaths
Ukrainian male kickboxers
Ukrainian Muay Thai practitioners
Mixed martial artists utilizing kickboxing
Ukrainian military personnel killed in the 2022 Russian invasion of Ukraine